Stella Blómkvist is an Icelandic crime television series which was first broadcast in 2017. It is produced by the Icelandic company Sagafilm. The show is loosely based on books of the same title by an anonymous Icelandic writer. The series was written by Jóhann Ævar Grímsson, Nanna Kristín Magnúsdóttir and Andri Óttarsson, and directed by Óskar Thór Axelsson.

After the success in Iceland the show became available in 2018 on Viaplay in the Nordic countries, in 2019 on Sundance Now in the United States and in 2020 SBS Australia acquired the rights for broadcasting in Australia.

After four years, a second season of the show premiered in Iceland on 30 September 2021 and became globally available in the months afterwards.

Synopsis for season 1 
The show follows lawyer Stella Blómkvist who is called to defend a client suspected of murdering Halla, a young woman who works as an assistant for the Icelandic Prime Minister. Initially, the case seems pretty clear-cut, but Stella soon finds out that someone is trying to frame her client for the murder and higher powers are eager to close the case as soon as possible, to cover up their own involvement. When she receives an anonymous tip which suggests that the Prime Minister himself might have committed the murder she starts her own investigation, which leads her to uncover a web of corruption, involving Icelandic politicians and high ranking Chinese officials.

Cast and characters

Main 
 Heida Reed as Stella Blómkvist
 Sara Dögg Ásgeirsdóttir as Dagbjört
 Jóhannes Haukur Jóhannesson as Sverrir
 Kristín Þóra Haraldsdóttir as Gunna
 Þorsteinn Guðmundsson as Raggi
 Steinunn Ólína Þorsteinsdóttir as Edda

Recurring 
 Bjarni Snæbjörnsson as Alexander
 David Yu as Guo Dai
 Sveinn Ólafur Gunnarsson as Valdi
 Hannes Óli Ágústsson as Haukur
 Kristín Lea as Halla (s1)
 Jóhann Kristófer Stefánsson as Sæmi
 Hilmar Guðjónsson police agent Steini
 Bing as Xi Feng
 Hanako Footman as Alba Noel (s2)
 Saga Garðarsdóttir as Myrra (s2)
 Adi Ezroni as Mossad Agent (s2)
 Ahd Tamimi as Nadim (s2)

Episodes

References 

2017 television series debuts
2010s Icelandic television series
2010s crime television series
Bisexuality-related television series
LGBT-related drama television series